Karonga is a district in the Northern Region of Malawi. The district covers an area of 3,355 km.² and has a population of 365,028. It is a border district between Malawi and Tanzania, mainly occupied by the Tumbuka and Nkhonde tribes. Other tribes include Henga tribe (mainly occupying the southern part).

Karonga District is the main border from Tanzania into Malawi, and the chief town is Karonga Boma.

Economics
Over the last few years, there has been much development in the region due to the discovery of uranium at the Kayelekera mine, which officially opened in 2009, and many of the previously gravelled roads have been laid with tarmac.

Tourism
There are many hotels and guesthouses in Karonga, along the shore of Lake Malawi. There is a museum - Karonga museum, at the Karonga centre which attracts more visitors and is located near Karonga ESCOM Office.

Government and administrative divisions

There are five National Assembly constituencies in Karonga:

 Karonga - Central
 Karonga - North
 Karonga - North West
 Karonga - Nyungwe
 Karonga - South

Since the 2009 election Karonga Nyungwe has been represented by an AFORD politician, and the other seats are held by members of the Democratic Progressive Party.

The traditional authorities are Wasambo, Kyungu, Mwakaboko, Kilipula, Mwirang'ombe and the central township of Karonga Boma.

Demographics

Ethnic groups 
At the time of the 2018 Census of Malawi, the distribution of the population of Karonga District by ethnic group was as follows:
 41.7% Tumbuka
 38.0% Nkhonde
 3.3% Sukwa
 2.5% Lambya
 2.5% Chewa
 0.9% Ngoni
 0.5% Tonga
 0.5% Yao
 0.4% Lomwe
 0.1% Sena
 0.1% Mang'anja
 9.5% Others

Languages 
The main languages of the northern part of Karonga District are Nyakyusa, and the like of Lusako names are of Nyakyusa and Kyangonde (closely related to Nyakyusa). In the south, Tumbuka is spoken, and in the centre, including Karonga town itself, Chinkhonde (a dialect of Kyangonde heavily influenced by Tumbuka). There are some pockets of Swahili speakers along the border with Tanzania, and a few speakers of Chindali, Chimambwe, and Chisukwa along the border with Chitipa District.

Cities and towns
Karonga (capital)
Chilumba

Notable Malawians from Karonga
Geoffrey Du Mhango
Bazuka Mhango
Temwa Nyirenda
Roselyn Msowoya

References 

 
Districts of Malawi
Districts in Northern Region, Malawi